Pin Hook is an unincorporated community in Washington Township, Parke County, in the U.S. state of Indiana.

Geography

References

Unincorporated communities in Parke County, Indiana
Unincorporated communities in Indiana